Dennis Visser (born 20 January 1993 in Benoni, South Africa) is a South African rugby union player who currently plays for the  in the United Rugby Championship. His regular position is lock.

Career

Falcons and Blue Bulls Under-19 (2009–2012)

At high school level, Visser represented East Rand side  at the 2009 Under-16 Grant Khomo Week. He moved to Pretoria to complete his schooling Afrikaanse Hoër Seunskool and then joined the academy of the Pretoria-based .

In 2012, he was a key member of the  side that participated in the 2012 Under-19 Provincial Championship; he played in all fourteen of their matches in the competition, starting thirteen of those. His side finished in second spot on the log after the regular season to qualify for the play-offs, and Visser helped them beat the s 46–35 in the semi-final, but finished on the losing side in the final, as  became champions after a 22–18 win.

South Africa Under-20, Blue Bulls Under-21 and UP-Tuks (2013–2015)

Visser was selected to represent a South African Under-20 that played at the 2013 IRB Junior World Championship held in France and attempted to retain the title they won in 2012. Visser started all three pool matches as South Africa got off to a good start, beating the United States 97–0, England 31–24 and hosts France 26–19 to top their pool and to qualify to the semi-finals. He also started their semi-final match as they lost 17–18 to Wales, and in their third-place play-off match as they beat New Zealand 41–34 to finish the competition in third spot.

He returned to domestic action for the  side during the 2013 Under-21 Provincial Championship. He didn't play in their first match of the season, but featured in all of their remaining thirteen matches, starting seven of those and also scoring a try in their match against  in a 21–32 defeat. The season had a similar outcome than the 2012 season with the Under-19s; the Blue Bulls U21s finished in second spot on the log to qualify for the semi-finals, they won their semi-final match against the Sharks – 36–13 on this occasion – before losing the final to Western Province, who won 30–23 in the match played in Durban.

The following season, Visser was included in the  squad that participated in the 2014 Varsity Cup competition. He started all seven of their matches, but could not help his side qualify for the play-offs (the first time since in four seasons they failed to do so) as they finished in sixth position on the log. He made ten appearances for the s in the 2014 Under-21 Provincial Championship, starting six of those as the Blue Bulls preferred Irné Herbst and Marvin Orie as their starting locks for the competition.

Visser again featured in all of ' matches in the 2015 Varsity Cup competition. They improved on their 2014 showing and topped the log after the regular season to qualify for the semi-finals. Visser featured in their semi-final match against , but could not help them reach the final, with the side from Potchefstroom winning 29–28 to progress instead. He ended on the winning side as the Blue Bulls won 83–13 against their affiliated sub-union. That was his last action of 2015, as an ankle injury ruled him out for the remainder of the year.

Cheetahs and UFS Shimlas (2016–2019)

In January 2016, he was released from the training squad to join Varsity Cup side .

Europe (2019–present)

References

South African rugby union players
Living people
1993 births
Rugby union locks
Blue Bulls players
Cheetahs (rugby union) players
Free State Cheetahs players
South Africa Under-20 international rugby union players
Rugby union players from Benoni
Griffons (rugby union) players
RC Narbonne players
Zebre Parma players